Bao Shanju (born 3 November 1997) is a Chinese cyclist. She competed in the women's team sprint event at the 2020 Summer Olympics. In the first round of the event, she and teammate Zhong Tianshi set a new world record with a time of 31.804 seconds. They both went on to win the gold medal, beating the German team in the event's final.

Career
Bao and her teammate Zhong Tianshi broke Team China's own world record previously set at the 2016 Rio de Janeiro Olympics by Zhong Tianshi and former team sprint teammate Gong Jinjie, with a new WR time of 31.804 seconds. While being awarded their gold medals at the podium ceremony, Bao and Zhong were seen with Mao Zedong pin-badges affixed to their team sporting jackets, alluding to symbollic patriotism, however, according to Graham Dunbar and Joe McDonald at Associated Press, this symbolism may be in breach of Olympic Charter Rule 50 (which prohibits political statements on the podium), and that this "incident came one day after silver medalist Raven Saunders (standing below gold medalist Gong Lijiao of China) crossed the wrists of her raised arms on the podium", to which Dunbar and McDonald remarked that it "was unclear" if it was "a response to the (Gong/Saunders) women's shot-put medal ceremony".

References

External links
 

1997 births
Living people
Chinese female cyclists
Olympic cyclists of China
Cyclists at the 2020 Summer Olympics
Olympic gold medalists for China
Olympic medalists in cycling
Place of birth missing (living people)
Medalists at the 2020 Summer Olympics
21st-century Chinese women